The Gheorghe Hagi Football Academy is a football youth academy based in Ovidiu, Constanța County, which serves as the primary youth clinic of Romanian club Farul Constanța. Until 2021, it was the primary youth clinic of Viitorul Constanța.

Founded in 2009 by former Romanian international Gheorghe Hagi, the academy cost €11 million and is one of the biggest and most modern in Southeastern Europe, holding over 300 players, 9 training fields and other facilities.

The president of the Academy is Pavel Peniu and vice president is Neculai Tănasă.

Notable former players 

1990-1995
 Romario Benzar
 Gabriel Iancu
 Bogdan Țîru
 Boban Nikolov
 Florin Tanase
 Mihai Balasa
 Ionut Vina
 Alexandru Mitrita

1996-1998
 Razvan Marin
 Cristian Manea
 Dragos Nedelcu
 Alexandru Cicaldau
 Ianis Hagi
 Florinel Coman
 Andrei Ciobanu
 Virgil Ghiță
 Tiberiu Căpușă

1999-2001
 Tudor Băluță
 Alexandru Mățan
 Denis Dragus
 Radu Boboc

2002-2006
 Louis Munteanu
 Enes Sali

Honours

Leagues
Liga Elitelor U19
Winners (3): 2015–16, 2017–18, 2018–19
Liga Elitelor U17
Winners (3): 2015–16, 2017–18, 2018–19

Cups
Cupa României U19
Winners (1): 2016–17
Runners-up (1): 2018–19 
Cupa României U19
Winners (1): 2017–18
Runners-up (2): 2015–16, 2018–19 
Romanian Supercup U19
Winners (2): 2018, 2019
Runners-up (2): 2016, 2017
Romanian Supercup U17
Winners (2): 2016, 2019
Runners-up (1): 2018
Puskás Cup:
 Third place (1): 2015

References

External links
Viitorul Constanța official website

Football academies in Europe
Football in Romania
Sport in Constanța
Ovidiu